Jasen Pratt is a Canadian former swimmer active in the late 1980s and early 1990s.

A native of Alberta, Pratt was a national champion in the 200 m and 400 m individual medley. He came seventh in the 400 m individual medley at the Pan American Games in Mar del Plata and retired soon after to move into coaching.

Pratt is the eldest brother of ice hockey players Harlan Pratt and Nolan Pratt. Both his daughter Halle Pratt and son Cole Pratt competed at the Tokyo Olympics, as a synchronised swimmer and backstroke swimmer respectively.

References

External links

Year of birth missing (living people)
Living people
Canadian male medley swimmers
Sportspeople from Alberta
Pan American Games bronze medalists for Canada
Pan American Games medalists in swimming
Medalists at the 1991 Pan American Games
Swimmers at the 1991 Pan American Games
Swimmers at the 1995 Pan American Games